Toddsbury is a historic home located on the banks of the North River in Gloucester County, Virginia. The house was built around 1669 by Thomas Todd and inhabited by his descendants until 1880. The builder Thomas Todd was the son of an English emigrant of the same name who patented land in Elizabeth City County in 1647 and in Gloucester County in 1664. However, he moved to Maryland and became a burgess for Baltimore County before dying at sea in 1676. The wife of one of the early settlers named Thomas Todd was Ann Gorsuch, daughter of Rev. John Gorsuch.

The house continues to be a private residence.

A story and a half building of brick laid in Flemish bond. A L shaped house with a center stair hall, and two flanking rooms in the long arm and a subsidiary stair hall and another room in the wing. Toddsbury is a 17th-century house with 18th-century additions. The land was patented by Thomas Todd in 1657 but later went to the Tabb family. About 1870 it was purchased by the parents of William Mott, who died about 1939, and has been since then the Mott family house.

It was listed on the National Register of Historic Places in 1969.

References

External links

Toddsbury, Vicinity of State Routes 622 & 3-14 Intersection, Nuttall, Gloucester County, VA: 37 photos, 8 color transparencies, 9 measured drawings, 5 data pages, and 3 photo caption pages at Historic American Buildings Survey
Toddsbury, Outbuildings & Gardens, Vicinity of State Routes 622 & 3-14 Intersection, Nuttall, Gloucester County, VA: 7 photos and 2 photo caption pages at Historic American Buildings Survey

Historic American Buildings Survey in Virginia
Houses on the National Register of Historic Places in Virginia
Houses completed in 1669
Houses in Gloucester County, Virginia
National Register of Historic Places in Gloucester County, Virginia
1669 establishments in Virginia